Kirchwey may refer to one of the following individuals:

 Freda Kirchwey (1893 - 1976), an American journalist, editor and publisher.
 George (Washington) Kirchwey LL.D (1855, Detroit - 1942), an American legal scholar
 Karl Kirchwey, an American poet

German-language surnames